Cavallone may refer to:
Alberto Cavallone (1938–1997), Italian film director and screenwriter
Paolo Cavallone  (born 1975), Italian composer, pianist, and poet
Grotta del Cavallone, a cave in Italy

Italian-language surnames